This is a list of films produced in Pakistan in 2002 and in the Urdu language

2002

See also
2002 in Pakistan

External links
 Search Pakistani film - IMDB.com

2002
Pakistani
Films